Hungary returned to the Eurovision Song Contest 2007 after skipping the 2006 Contest. It was represented by Magdi Rúzsa with the song "Unsubstantial Blues".

Before Eurovision

Fonogram Hungarian Music Awards 2007 
The Hungarian entrant at the Eurovision Song Contest 2007 was selected through the "Discovery of the Year" category of the 2007 Fonogram Hungarian Music Awards (Hungarian: Fonogram – Magyar Zenei Díj), which took place on 24 February 2007 at the Jövő Háza Theater in Budapest and was broadcast on the First Channel of Magyar Televízió. A preselection jury nominated six artists for the category and the winner, Magdi Rúzsa, was selected by a public vote consisting of votes submitted through telephone and SMS voting. SMS voting started 2 weeks before the event and closed 1 hour before the end of the show.

The gala included guest appearances from Back II Black, Magna Cum Laude, Quimby, Adrien Szekeres & Laci Gáspár, Moby Dick, Sugarloaf, Erős & Spigiboy, Desperado, Ghymes, Tamás Mester, Cotton Club Singers, Tankcsapda, Charlie and eventual winner Magdi Rúzsa. Rúzsa's win caused controversy in Hungary, as the singer was born & raised in the Serbian province of Vojvodina, leading people to question why a "Serb" was representing the country rather than a Hungarian, leading to speculation that the reason Rúzsa was crying upon receiving her award was due to the crowd heckling her beforehand.

Song selection 
Magdi Rúzsa's Eurovision entry, "Unsubstantial Blues", selected from her debut album Ördögi angyal, was released and presented to the public on 12 March 2007. Controversy arose after it was selected because Rúzsa had sung a verse as part of her audition for the television program Megasztár in February 2006. The EBU required that no portion of an entry be "commercially released and/or publicly performed" before October 1, 2006, to be eligible for the contest. In the end the song was allowed to remain in the competition.

At Eurovision

Due to missing the 2006 contest, Hungary had to compete in the semi-final of the Eurovision Song Contest 2007. Magdi Rúzsa represented Hungary at Eurovision, singing "Unsubstantial Blues" performed 22nd, following Andorra and preceding Estonia. In the semi-final she came 2nd with 224 points and qualified to the final. She performed 8th in final, following Slovenia and preceding Lithuania, and finished the contest in ninth place with 128 points.

The Hungarian commentator was Gábor Gundel Takács and the spokesperson was Éva Novodomszky.

Voting

Points awarded to Hungary

Points awarded by Hungary

References

2007
Countries in the Eurovision Song Contest 2007
Eurovision